Géza Gárdonyi, born Géza Ziegler (3 August 1863 – 30 October 1922) was a Hungarian writer and journalist. Although he wrote a range of works, he had his greatest success as a historical novelist, particularly with Eclipse of the Crescent Moon and Slave of the Huns.

Life

Gárdonyi was born in Agárdpuszta, Kingdom of Hungary, the son of a machinist on the estate of an aristocrat in Western Hungary. He graduated from at a college for teachers and worked for some years as a teacher and Catholic cantor. He married Mária Molnár in 1885, but their marriage was unhappy, and they separated in 1892.

Gárdonyi's career as a writer started off when he began writing for magazines and newspapers in the mid-1880s. His first successes were the satirical "Göre Gábor" letters on rural life, works which he later repudiated. Around the turn of the century, he started to tackle historical themes in writing, which resulted in a series of fine novels.

He moved to Eger (today's northern Hungary) in 1897 with his mother and lived there until his death. He is also buried there, with his tomb bearing the inscription Csak a teste ("Only his body"). The house where he lived and did most of his writing is now preserved as a museum.

Best known work

Eclipse of the Crescent Moon

Gárdonyi's most famous novel Egri csillagok was published in 1899. The title translates literally as Stars of Eger, but it was published in English as Eclipse of the Crescent Moon. It is set around a famous siege of the town of Eger in Hungary by the Ottomans in the year 1552. In 2005 this book was voted "the most popular novel of Hungary" by viewers of the television programme Big Read (A Nagy Könyv).

Slave of the Huns

In the opinion of some people, his best work was A láthatatlan ember, published in 1901.  The title translates literally as The Invisible Man, but it was published in English as Slave of the Huns.  It is set around the time of Attila the Hun.

Although these two novels are very well known in Hungary, translations into English and other European languages only became widely published in the late 20th century.

Works
Egri csillagok (Stars of Eger / Eclipse of the Crescent Moon)
A láthatatlan ember (The Invisible Man / Slave of the Huns)
Isten rabjai (Captives of God)
A lámpás (The Lamp)
A bor (The Wine)
Ida regénye (Ida's Novel, adapted to the film Romance of Ida)
Hosszúhajú veszedelem (The Menace with Long Hair)
Az én falum (My Village)
Az égre néző lélek (Spirit, Looking at the Sky)
Állatmesék (Animal Tales)

See also
 List of Hungarian writers

External links

 
 
 
 Article on Hungarian writers which mentions him
 Géza Gárdonyi Historical Museum

1863 births
1922 deaths
People from Gárdony
Hungarian writers
Hungarian children's writers